ISO 3166-2:JM is the entry for Jamaica in ISO 3166-2, part of the ISO 3166 standard published by the International Organization for Standardization (ISO), which defines codes for the names of the principal subdivisions (e.g., provinces or states) of all countries coded in ISO 3166-1.

Currently for Jamaica, ISO 3166-2 codes are defined for 14 parishes.

Each code consists of two parts, separated by a hyphen. The second part is two digits (01–14). The codes are assigned in the 
counter-clockwise direction starting from Kingston Parish.

Current codes
Subdivision names are listed as in the ISO 3166-2 standard published by the ISO 3166 Maintenance Agency (ISO 3166/MA).

Click on the button in the header to sort each column.

See also
 Subdivisions of Jamaica
 FIPS region codes of Jamaica

External links
 ISO Online Browsing Platform: JM
 Parishes of Jamaica, Statoids.com

2:JM
ISO 3166-2
Jamaica geography-related lists